Fabien is both a French given masculine name and a French surname. Notable people with the name include:

People with the given name Fabien:

 Fabien Audard (born 1978), French professional football (soccer) player
 Fabien Barthez (born 1971), retired French football goalkeeper
 Fabien Boudarène (born 1978), French footballer
 Fabien Camus (born 1985), French football player
 Fabien Chéreau (born 1980), French computer programmer
 Fabien Cool (born 1972), former French football goalkeeper
 Fabien Cordeau (1923-2007), politician in Quebec, Canada
 Fabien Cousteau (born 1967), French aquatic filmmaker
 Fabien Delrue (born 2000), French badminton player
 Fabien Foret (born 1973), professional motorcycle racer
 Fabien Frankel (born 1994), British actor
 Fabien Galthié (born 1969), French rugby union coach and former player
 Fabien Gilot (born 1984), French Olympic and world champion swimmer
 Fabien Giroix (born 1960), French racing driver
 Fabien Laurenti (born 1983), French professional football (soccer) defender
 Fabien Leclercq (born 1972), French football player
 Fabien Lévy (born 1968), French composer
 Fabien Patanchon (born 1983), French professional road bicycle racer
 Fabien Pelous (born 1973), French rugby union footballer
 Fabien Roy (born 1928), politician in Quebec, Canada
 Fabien Sevitzky (1893–1967), American conductor
 Fabien Vorbe (born 1990), Haitian football (soccer) forward
 Fabien (born 1987), French model and actor

People with the surname Fabien:
 Cédric Fabien (born 1982), professional footballer
 Errol Fabien (21st century), television and radio presenter
 Louis Fabien (1924–2016), French painter
 Raymond Fabien (born 1945), retired sprinter

See also
 Fabian (disambiguation)
 Fabienne

French masculine given names
French-language surnames